The North Kawartha Knights are a Canadian Junior ice hockey team based in Apsley, Ontario, Canada. They play in the Orr Division of the Provincial Junior Hockey League.

History 
The North Kawartha Knights joined the Central Ontario Junior C. Hockey League in the 2014–15 season under the leadership of owner Gord Mackenzie-Crowe and GM Gary Geraldi. The team has since been sold to current owners Josh Perks, John Trotter Sr., John Trotter Jr., Ed Whitmore and Duane Wiltshire.

Season-by-season standings

References

External links
Knights webpage
OHA - PJHL
Go Knights Go

Ice hockey teams in Ontario
Kawartha Lakes
2014 establishments in Ontario
Ice hockey clubs established in 2014